The Mecca Masjid blast occurred on 18 May 2007 inside the Mecca Masjid, (or "Makkah Masjid") a mosque located in the old city area of Hyderabad, capital of the Indian state of Telangana located very close to Charminar. The blast was caused by a cellphone-triggered pipe bomb placed near the Wuzukhana, a spot where ablutions are performed. Two more live IEDs were found and defused by the police. Sixteen people were reported dead in the immediate aftermath, of whom five were killed by the police firing after the incident while trying to quell the mob.

On 16 April 2018, the NIA Court acquitted all 11 who were accused in the blasts, citing lack of evidence.

Overview
The bomb exploded around 1:15 pm in Mecca Masjid, a 400-year-old mosque in Hyderabad. The bomb was placed under a heavy marble platform, which took the force of the impact and saved many lives. Two more IEDs were found, one 100 meters away from the blast site and the other near the main gate. Both of them were defused 3 hours after the blast.

The blast occurred near the open air section of the Mecca Masjid. At the time of the blast more than 10,000 people were inside the mosque premises, for the Friday prayers. The injured were treated at the Osmania hospital in Hyderabad.

Following this Mumbai and other parts of Maharashtra were put on alert. State Home Minister K Jana Reddy said the blast, which injured over fifty people in addition to the death toll, could be the act of foreign elements.

Rioting and Police firing

Five individuals died as a result of the police firing, which caused considerable controversy. The Telegraph reports:

Six rounds were fired in the afternoon and evening to prevent shops and public property from being damaged, including petrol pumps and ATMs. One person was killed in the firing in the Moghalpura area, while two fell to the police bullets elsewhere. Another lost his life when the police had to pull the trigger to control a mob trying to break into an ATM.

According to police commissioner Balwinder Singh, his men resorted to firing after water cannons, tear gas and baton-charge failed to bring the mob fury under control.

It is reported that a frenzied mob attacked state-owned road transport corporation buses, forcing the closure of Falaknuma bus depot.

According to the police, the rioters were trying to set fire to a petrol pump. Inspector P. Sudhakar of Falaknuma police station, who has been removed from his position on the charge of opening fire `indiscriminately' to control the rampaging mobs stated:
"While I asked my subordinates to be on high alert, mobs from Shalibanda and the mosque came towards Moghalpura pelting stones. They set ablaze a wine shop and charged towards a petrol pump where we were stationed."

The mobs took out petrol from the dispenser and sprinkled it on the room. "When they tried to ignite it with the help of dry grass, I ordered my men to open fire with .303 rifles to disperse them," he says. "As the situation turned worse, I sought additional forces. Quick Reaction teams along with Moghalpura Inspector arrived and scattered the crowd by opening fire." At least 10 persons, including policemen, could have been killed if fire orders were not issued, he insists.

Suspected bombers
In January 2013, the then Indian Home Minister Sushilkumar Shinde, of Indian National Congress, accused Rashtriya Swayamsevak Sangh and Bharatiya Janata Party for setting up camps to train Hindu Terrorism including planting bombs in 2007 Samjhauta Express bombings, Mecca Masjid blast and 2006 Malegaon blasts. Rashtriya Swayamsevak Sangh spokesperson Ram Madhav responded to this allegation by accusing Shinde of pandering to Islamist groups like Jamaat-ud-Dawah and Lashkar-e-Taiba. In February 2013, after BJP threatened to boycott the parliament during the Budget session, Shinde apologised for his remarks and said that he had no intention to link terror to any religion and that there was no basis for suggesting that terror can be linked to organisations mentioned in his earlier speech.

The National Investigation Agency, Central Bureau of Investigation and Anti Terrorist Squad (India) claim former members of the RSS were behind the Makkah Masjid bombing. However, the South Asia Terrorism Portal, the Institute for Defence Studies and Analyses and the National Counterterrorism Center reported that Harkat-ul-Jihad al-Islami was actually behind the attacks based on initial investigations.

On 19 November 2010, the Central Bureau of Investigation produced the preacher Swami Aseemanand before the court in connection with the Makkah Masjid blast in Hyderabad in May 2007. Other cases that he has been linked with include 2007 Samjhauta Express bombings, 2008 Malegoan & Modasa bombing and Ajmer Sharif Dargah blast. 
On 15 January, the confession of Swami Aseemanand was published by Tehelka and CNN-IBN implicating various members of Saffron terror outfits in other cases such as Ajmer Sharif Dargah blast, 2006 Malegaon blasts, 2007 Samjhauta Express bombings, 2008 Malegoan & Modasa bombing. The confession was done in front of a magistrate citing the guilt he felt after seeing innocent Muslim boys arrested in the case by the police. However, in late March 2011, Aseemanand redacted his 'confession' alleging that he was coerced by the ATS to make a confession In April 2010, Aseemanand submitted a letter to the court which said: "I have been pressured mentally and physically by the investigating agencies to 'confess' that I was behind these blasts." He also said he was threatened and pressured to become a government witness in the case.

A letter written by Aseemanand on 20 December 2010, two days after his confession to the CBI, was presented as evidence in January 2011 to show that the confession he gave was actually voluntary. The letter, which was never sent, was addressed to the presidents of India and Pakistan and explained why he had wanted to confess and tell the truth after seeing the innocent people that had been arrested and implicated with him. After Aseemanand's alleged confession, the families of the 32 men arrested in the aftermath of the bombing have begun demanding the release of the youths from jail. However, this confession was later found to be obtained under duress. In late 2011, Aseemanand wrote a petition to President of India Pratibha Patil describing torture allegedly meted out to him during his confinement, prompting the Punjab and Haryana high courts to issue a notice to the National Investigation Agency to investigate the allegations of torture

The National Investigation Agency, Central Bureau of Investigation and Anti Terrorist Squad (India) questioned former members of the RSS On 19 November 2010, the Central Bureau of Investigation produced Swami Aseemanand before the court in connection with the Blast. But later he has retracted the confession citing the mental and physical pressure to provide that confession. The Special investigation Team (SIT) of Hyderabad Police arrested 'south India commander' of the Lashkar-e-Taiba (LeT) Islamist terrorist organisation, identified as Shaik Abdul Khaja alias Amjad, from Afzalgunj area of the city. Police said that the arrestee was linked to Mohammed Abdul Shahid Bilal, key suspect in the bombing. In 2013, Yasin Bhatkal confessed that Indian Mujahideen had bombed two other places in Hyderabad later in August 2007 to avenge Mecca Masjid blast which was then allegedly attributed to Hindu fundamental groups.

The South Asia Terrorism Portal, the Institute for Defence Studies and Analyses, the National Counter Terrorism Centre the United States, and the United Nations reported that Harkat-ul-Jihad al-Islami was actually behind the attacks while excluding involvement by any Hindu group. Noting this, security analyst Bahukutumbi Raman has questioned "the two different versions that have emerged from Indian and American investigators." The South Asia Terrorism Portal cited Vikar Ahmed as a main suspect in the blast. Mohammed Abdul Shahid Bilal, former chief of HuJI's Indian operations, is also regarded as a key suspect in the Mecca Masjid bombing. Later he was shot by unknown gunmen in Karachi on 30 August 2007.

Security analyst Bahukutumbi Raman questioned "the two different versions that have emerged from Indian and American investigators." The CBI have also claimed that the United States National Counterterrorism Center (NCTC) does not seem to be up to date with the latest investigation, after the NCTC director cited HuJI as the perpetrators in a 2010 document to the United States Senate. The South Asia Terrorism Portal cited Vikar Ahmed as a main suspect in the blast, and also noted that on 3 December 2008 Vikar Ahmed and an accomplice, Amjad were accused of firing at police officers attempting to arrest them in Hyderabad. Vikar Ahmed also stands accused of murdering one police officer and injuring three others in an attack conducted on Friday, 14 May 2010

Court hearings and verdict 
The NIA began the probe in April 2011 after the initial investigations by the local police and the chargesheet filed by the CBI.  226 witnesses were examined during the trial and about 411 documents exhibited. The verdict was pronounced by a special NIA court acquitting all the accused due to lack of evidence.

The Special NIA judge Ravindra Reddy resigned post the verdict.

See also

Religious violence in India
Saffron Terror
Terrorism in India
2006 Malegaon blasts
2007 Samjhauta Express bombings
2007 Ajmer Dargah attack
2008 Malegoan & Modasa bombing

References

External links 

 Article on Zee News
Bomb hits mosque in India
9 killed in Hyderabad blast; 5 in police firing
Bomb hits Indian Mosque (MSNBC)
5 killed in Indian Mosque attack (CNN)

21st-century mass murder in India
Mass murder in 2007
Improvised explosive device bombings in India
Terrorist incidents in Hyderabad, India
Mosque bombings in Asia
Massacres in religious buildings and structures
Terrorist incidents in India in 2007
Hinduism-motivated violence in India
May 2007 events in Asia
Attacks on religious buildings and structures in India
Building bombings in India